Grassy Ridge is a ridge in the Blue Ridge Mountains in Georgia that runs south to north along the Eastern Continental Divide in Rabun County, Georgia. Grassy Ridge is in the Southern Nantahala Wilderness of the Chattahoochee National Forest

Grassy Ridge was burned during the 2016 Rock Mountain Fire.

See also
List of mountains in Georgia (U.S. state)

Sources

Georgia Above 4,000 Feet

Ridges of Georgia (U.S. state)
Landforms of Rabun County, Georgia
Chattahoochee-Oconee National Forest